Miles Coverdale Stocks Barron (1871 – 1924) was an English football administrator and manager.

Personal life
Barron married in 1893, and went on to live in St Helen Auckland.

Career
A surveyor by trade, Barron had served as club secretary for a number of football clubs in the North East of his native England, notably organising trips to face European opposition. Most notable of these European trips was with West Auckland Football Club, an amateur team of coalminers from County Durham, who defeated Swiss opposition FC Winterthur in 1909 to claim the inaugural Sir Thomas Lipton Trophy. These events were later dramatised in the 1982 television movie, The World Cup: A Captain's Tale, with Barron being portrayed by Richard Griffiths. However, despite beating Italian side Juventus two years later to win the competition again, the club met with financial hardship and were forced to disband.

These exploits in Europe caught the eye of Barcelona president Joan Gamper, who invited Barron to become head coach of Barcelona in the autumn of 1912. Barron was also tasked with assembling a squad of British players for Barcelona to test its strength against. The team, known as the West Auckland Wanderers, was compiled of numerous members of the West Auckland side that had won two Sir Thomas Lipton Trophy titles.

The sides played three matches, with the first game played on Christmas Day of 1912: a 3–3 draw, in which Barcelona's goals were scored by two British players, Alex Steel and Frank Allack. The second game resulted in a 4–0 loss for Barcelona, but in the final fixture, played on 29 December, Steel provided two goals in a 2–0 victory for the Catalan club. Following this, Gamper attempted to persuade Barron to continue on as head coach, an offer which Barron declined in order to return to his job as a surveyor in England.

Despite leaving Barcelona, his impact was longer-lasting. Former West Auckland player, and friend of Barron, Jack Greenwell, who had played in the side that won the 1909 Sir Thomas Lipton Trophy, and had already been playing for Barcelona upon Barron's arrival, decided to stay in Barcelona after the string of friendlies, going on to manage the side for two separate spells.

Incorrectly named "B. Barren" on Barcelona's official website (and earlier as "John Barrow"), he is listed as the club's second official coach, after Billy Lambe, who had served as player-manager earlier in 1912.

Later life and death
Barron would not remain in football, and with the onset of the First World War in 1914, he was commissioned into the Royal Engineers, serving in the Salonika campaign, where he contracted malaria. The disease affected most of his later life, and he eventually succumbed to it, dying at the age of 52 in 1924.

Notes

References

1871 births
1924 deaths
People from County Durham
English football managers
FC Barcelona managers
English expatriate football managers
English expatriate sportspeople in Spain
Expatriate football managers in Spain
British Army personnel of World War I
Royal Engineers officers